The fourth season of Numbers, an American television series, first aired on September 28, 2007 and ended on May 16, 2008. Because of the Writers Guild of America strike, only 12 episodes were initially produced for this season. Following the end of the strike, six more were announced.

Cast

Main 
 Rob Morrow as Don Eppes
 David Krumholtz as Charlie Eppes
 Judd Hirsch as Alan Eppes
 Alimi Ballard as David Sinclair
 Peter MacNicol as Larry Fleinhardt
 Navi Rawat as Amita Ramanujan
 Diane Farr as Megan Reeves
 Dylan Bruno as Colby Granger

Recurring 
 Aya Sumika as Liz Warner
 Will Patton as Lt. Gary Walker
 Michelle Nolden as AUSA Robin Brooks
 Leslie Silva as M.E. Ridenhour

Guest

Episodes

References 
NOTE: Refs Need Archive Backup URLs @  https://archive.org/web/

External links 
 

4
4
2007 American television seasons
2008 American television seasons